Gymnastics events have been staged at the Olympic Games since 1896. Since then, 30 female gymnasts have won at least five total medals. The country with the most athletes on this list is the Soviet Union, with nine. Romania (7), United States (5), Hungary (4), East Germany (2), Russia (2), and Czechoslovakia (1) are also represented.

Eight female gymnasts have won at least eight medals at the Olympic Games: Larisa Latynina (18), Věra Čáslavská (11), Ágnes Keleti (10), Polina Astakhova (10), Nadia Comăneci (9), Ludmilla Tourischeva (9), Margit Korondi (8), and Sofia Muratova (8).

Larisa Latynina and Polina Astakhova each competed for the Soviet Union in 1956, 1960, and 1964. Latynina has the most medals of any female athlete in Olympic history, with 18. She won six medals in each Olympic Games that she competed in, winning the individual all-around titles in 1956 and 1960. Astakhova won two medals in 1956, four medals in 1960, and four medals in 1964. She won the uneven bars golds in 1960 and 1964. Sofia Muratova was Latynina's and Astakhova's teammate in 1956 and 1960. Muratova won a total of eight medals. Ludmilla Tourischeva also competed for the Soviet Union. She won one medal in 1968, four medals in 1972, and four medals in 1976.

Ágnes Keleti and Margit Korondi both competed for Hungary in 1956 and 1960. Keleti won 10 medals, including two golds on floor exercise. Korondi won eight total medals.

Czechoslovakia's Věra Čáslavská won 11 total Olympic medals, the second-most of any female gymnast. She won one in 1960, four in 1964, and six in 1968. She won the individual all-around golds in 1964 and 1968. Nadia Comăneci, who competed for Romania in 1976 and 1980, won nine medals. In 1976, she became the first gymnast to earn a perfect 10 and eventually achieved that mark seven times during the Games. She also won the individual all-around gold that year.

See also

List of multiple Olympic gold medalists
List of multiple Olympic medalists
List of Olympic medalists in gymnastics (women)
List of top female medalists at major artistic gymnastics events
List of female artistic gymnasts with the most appearances at Olympic Games

References

medal leaders
Lists of medalists in gymnastics
Lists of Olympic female gymnasts
Gymnastics
gymnastics